USCGC Charles Sexton (WPC-1108) is the eighth  cutter, and the second to be based in Key West, Florida.
She was delivered to the United States Coast Guard for a final evaluation and shakedown on December 10, 2013, and the vessel was commissioned on March 8, 2014.

Design
The Sentinel-class cutters were designed to replace the shorter  s. Charles Sexton is armed with a remote-control  Bushmaster autocannon and four crew-served M2HB .50-caliber machine guns. It has a bow thruster for maneuvering in crowded anchorages and channels. It also has small underwater fins for coping with the rolling and pitching caused by large waves. It has a complement of twenty-two crew members. Like the Marine Protector class, and the cancelled extended Island-class cutters, the Sentinel-class cutters deploy the Short Range Prosecutor rigid-hulled inflatable (SRP or RHIB) in rescues and interceptions.

Operational career

On May 21, 2015, the Charles Sexton intercepted 117 undocumented migrants from the Dominican Republic from a dangerously overloaded boat.  93 men and 24 women were repatriated home.

Charles Sexton joined in the search for the freighter , which disappeared during an October 2015 Hurricane Joaquin. 

The cutter intercepted 39 Cuban refugees, for return to Cuba, in November 2015.  Three separate refugee craft were intercepted.

In November, 2018, the Charles Sexton, and her sister ship, the William Trump, interdicted 36 Cuban migrants, and repatriated 35 of them to Cabañas, Cuba.  One migrant seemed to suffer from respiratory arrest. The onboard EMT treated the victim, who was then sent to a US port for further medical treatment.

Namesake

The vessel is named after Charles W. Sexton, who served as a Machinery Technician in the United States Coast Guard.
Sexton lost his life while rescuing fishermen off the mouth of the Columbia River.

References

External links

2013 ships
Ships built in Lockport, Louisiana
Sentinel-class cutters